Spartocus IV was a Spartocid king of the Bosporan Kingdom from 245 to 240 BC.

Biography
Spartocus IV was a son of Paerisades II and is known for an inscription in coinage after the death of his father that shows him calling himself king whilst displaying Pan. His brief reign ended when his brother Leucon II killed him, after finding out that he was sleeping with his wife Alcathoe, who later killed Leucon.

References

External links
 Collection of coins from the reign of Spartocus IV here

3rd-century BC monarchs
Monarchs of the Bosporan Kingdom
Spartocid dynasty